Nanny Ogg's Cookbook is a recipe book written from the in-world perspective of Discworld character Nanny Ogg. Nanny Ogg's Cookbook was written by Terry Pratchett, Stephen Briggs and Tina Hannan, and illustrated by Paul Kidby.

External links
 

Discworld books
Cookbooks
1999 books